NGC 186 is a barred lenticular galaxy located 3.4 million light-years away in the constellation Pisces. It was discovered by Bindon Blood Stoney in 1852.

References

External links
 

0186
Barred lenticular galaxies
Pisces (constellation)
0390
2291
+00-02-098